Serenata is the ninth studio album by Alfie Boe. It was released on 17 November 2014 in the United Kingdom by Decca Records. The album peaked at number 14 on the UK Albums Chart.

Track listing

Chart performance

Weekly charts

Certifications

Release history

References

2014 albums
Alfie Boe albums